Sharanu Salagar is an Indian politician from Bharatiya Janata Party. In May 2021, he was elected as a member of the Karnataka Legislative Assembly from Basavakalyan (constituency). He defeated Mala B. Narayanrao of Indian National Congress by 20,629 votes in 2021 By-elections.

References 

Living people
21st-century Indian politicians
People from  Kalaburagi district
Bharatiya Janata Party politicians from Karnataka
Karnataka MLAs 2018–2023
1975 births